Impressive may refer to:

 Impressive (horse), an Appendix American Quarter Horse (1969–1995)
 Impressive dagger moth or Acronicta impressa, a moth of the family Noctuidae 
 Impressive syndrome or hyperkalemic periodic paralysis, a genetic disorder that occurs in horses and humans

Music
 Impressive (album), a 1992 studio album by Japanese jazz fusion band T-Square
 "Impressive Instant", a song by American singer-songwriter Madonna from her 2000 studio album Music
 Be Impressive, the debut studio album by Australian indie rock band The Griswolds

Computer programs
 Impressive (presentation program), a simple and open source presentation program (PDF documents, LaTeX slides, digital images)

See also
 Impress (disambiguation)
 Impression (disambiguation)
 Impressionism
 Impressment